Fields of Gold: The Best of Sting 1984–1994 is the first compilation issued by Sting.  It features hit singles from his first four studio albums The Dream of the Blue Turtles, ...Nothing Like the Sun, The Soul Cages, and Ten Summoner's Tales. A companion music video compilation was released on LaserDisc and VHS.

Album information
The album features two new songs, "When We Dance" and "This Cowboy Song", which were both released as singles.

Track listing

U.S. edition 
All tracks written by Sting.
 "When We Dance" – 5:59
New song (1994)
 "If You Love Somebody Set Them Free" – 4:15
Originally released on the album The Dream of the Blue Turtles (1985).
 "Fields of Gold" – 3:38
Originally released on the album Ten Summoner's Tales (1993).
 "All This Time" – 4:54
Originally released on the album The Soul Cages (1991).
 "Fortress Around Your Heart" – 4:35
Remixed version of track originally released on the album The Dream of the Blue Turtles (1985).
 "Be Still My Beating Heart" – 5:32
Originally released on the album ...Nothing Like the Sun (1987).
 "They Dance Alone (Cueca Solo)" – 7:13
Originally released on the album ...Nothing Like the Sun (1987).
 "If I Ever Lose My Faith in You" – 4:30
Originally released on the album Ten Summoner's Tales (1993).
 "Fragile" – 3:52
Originally released on the album ...Nothing Like the Sun (1987).
 "Why Should I Cry for You?" – 4:51
Remixed version of track originally released on the album The Soul Cages.
 "Englishman in New York" – 4:27
Originally released on the album ...Nothing Like the Sun (1987).
 "We'll Be Together" – 3:50
Previously unreleased version of track originally released on the album ...Nothing Like the Sun.
 "Russians" – 3:57
Originally released on the album The Dream of the Blue Turtles (1985).
 "This Cowboy Song" – 5:00
New song (1994)

International edition
 "When We Dance" – 5:59
New song (1994)
 "If You Love Somebody Set Them Free" – 4:15
Originally released on the album The Dream of the Blue Turtles (1985).
 "Fields of Gold" – 3:38
Originally released on the album Ten Summoner's Tales (1993).
 "All This Time" – 4:54
Originally released on the album The Soul Cages (1991).
 "Englishman in New York" – 4:27
Originally released on the album ...Nothing Like the Sun (1987).
 "Mad About You" – 3:53
Originally released on the album The Soul Cages(1991).
 "It's Probably Me" " 5:02
Originally released on the album Lethal Weapon 3 (soundtrack) (1992).
 "They Dance Alone (Cueca Solo)" – 7:13
Originally released on the album ...Nothing Like the Sun (1987).
 "If I Ever Lose My Faith in You" – 4:30
Originally released on the album Ten Summoner's Tales (1993).
 "Fragile" – 3:52
Originally released on the album ...Nothing Like the Sun (1987).
 "We'll Be Together" – 3:50
Alternate version of track originally released on the album ...Nothing Like the Sun (1987, r1994).
 "Moon Over Bourbon Street" – 3:59
 "Love Is the Seventh Wave" – 3:31
 "Russians" – 3:57
Tracks 12–14 originally released on the album The Dream of the Blue Turtles (1985).
 "Why Should I Cry for You" – 4:51
Alternate version of track originally released on the album The Soul Cages (1991, r1994).
 "This Cowboy Song" – 5:00
New song (1994)
 "Fragil" – 3:51
Originally released on the EP Nada Como el Sol (1988). Replaced "Fragile" on the Brazilian edition.
 "Take Me to the Sunshine"
Appears on a single-track CD included with the Japanese release.

LaserDisc/VHS
Side one
 "When We Dance" – 5:59
New song (1994)
 "If You Love Somebody Set Them Free" – 4:15
Originally released on the album The Dream of the Blue Turtles (1985).
 "Fields of Gold" – 3:39
Originally released on the album Ten Summoner's Tales (1993).
 "All This Time" – 4:55
Originally released on the album The Soul Cages (1991).
 "Fortress Around Your Heart" – 4:35
Remixed version of track originally released on the album The Dream of the Blue Turtles (1985).
 "Be Still My Beating Heart" – 5:32
Originally released on the album ...Nothing Like the Sun (1987).
 "Bring on the Night"
LaserDisc/VHS version exclusive
 "They Dance Alone (Cueca Solo)" – 7:10
Originally released on the album ...Nothing Like the Sun (1987).
 "If I Ever Lose My Faith in You" – 4:31
Originally released on the album Ten Summoner's Tales (1993).
 "Fragile" – 3:53
Originally released on the album ...Nothing Like the Sun (1987).
 "Why Should I Cry for You" – 4:50
Alternate version of track originally released on the album The Soul Cages (1991, r1994).
 "Englishman in New York" – 4:27
Originally released on the album ...Nothing Like the Sun (1987).

Side two
 "Russians" – 3:58
originally released on the album The Dream of the Blue Turtles (1985).
 "It's Probably Me" (with Eric Clapton)
LaserDisc/VHS version exclusive
 "We'll Be Together" – 3:51
Studio/music video version. Originally released on the album ...Nothing Like the Sun (1987).
 "Demolition Man"
LaserDisc/VHS version exclusive
 "This Cowboy Song" – 5:00
New song (1994)

Singles 
"When We Dance" (1994) #9 UK, #38 US
"This Cowboy Song" (1994) #15 UK

Charts

Weekly charts

Year-end charts

Certifications

References 

1994 greatest hits albums
Sting (musician) compilation albums
Albums produced by Hugh Padgham
A&M Records compilation albums
1994 video albums
Music video compilation albums
A&M Records video albums